Too soon or Too Soon may refer to:

Too Soon?, book by cartoon celebrity portraits by Drew Friedman (cartoonist)
Too Soon, Season 8  Episode 17 of Doctors (2000 TV series)
Too Soon, 2004 album by Matthew Jay
"Too Soon", song by DJ Vanic
An audience comment to a joke made by Gilbert Gottfried after the September 11th attacks: 
Humor based on the September 11 attacks

See also